= Levieux =

Levieux is a French surname.

== Alternative spellings or older variations of the surname ==
- Lavieux
- Levieu
- Lavieu
- Levieil
- Levieille
- Lavie
- Levie
- Levye
- Levy
- Levi
- Delevieux
- Levyeux
- Le Vieux
- de la Vieu
